Pero is a masculine given name. In South Slavic usage it is a diminutive form of the name Petar. In Portuguese, it was spelled Pêro until the 1990 Orthographic Agreement of Portuguese; now it is spelled Pero.

Notable people with the given name include:

 Pêro de Alenquer, 15th century Portuguese explorer of the African coast
 Pero Antić (born 1982), National Basketball Association player from Macedonia
 Pero Blazevski (born 1972), Macedonian former basketball player
 Pero Budmani (1835-1914), Dubrovnik linguist and philologist
 Pero Bukejlović (born 1946), Prime Minister of Republika Srpska
 Pero Cameron (born 1974), New Zealand professional basketball player
 Pêro da Covilhã (c. 1460-after 1526), Portuguese diplomat and explorer
 Pero Čingrija (1837–1921), Croatian politician
 Pero Dujmović (born 1977), Croatian basketball player and agent
 Pêro Escobar, 15th century Portuguese navigator
 Pero Ferrús, Castilian poet
 Pero Jones (c. 1753–c. 1798), the eponym of a bridge in the city of Bristol in the United Kingdom
 Pero Kovačević (born 1957), Croatian lawyer and politician
 Pero Kvrgić (1927–2020), Croatian actor of Serb and Austrian descent
 Pero López de Ayala (1332-1407), Castilian statesman, historian, poet, chronicler, chancellor and courtier
 Pero Pejić (born 1982), Croatian footballer
 Pero Pirker (1927–1972), Croatian and Yugoslav politician
 Pero Popović (1881–1941), Bosnian Serb painter
 Pero Simić (1946–2016), Bosnian Serb journalist and historian
 Pero Stanić (born 1963), Bosnian Croat volleyball player
 Pero Škorić (born 1969), Serbian football player
 Pero Vaz de Caminha (c. 1450–15 December 1500), Portuguese writer of the official report of the discovery of Brazil.

Pero is also a surname. Notable people with the surname include:

 A. J. Pero (born 1959), drummer
 George Pero (born 1919), American tennis player
 Mike Pero (born 1960), New Zealander businessman

See also
 
 Perović
 Perić
 Perica

Croatian masculine given names
Macedonian masculine given names
Serbian masculine given names